The third-generation Moto G is an Android smartphone developed by Lenovo's subsidiary Motorola Mobility, unveiled in India on July 28, 2015 and released the same day. The Moto G4 is its successor.

Specifications

The third-generation Moto G has a 5-inch display with HD resolution of 1280x720p and features Corning Gorilla Glass 3, a 13-megapixel camera similar to the one from the Nexus 6 with many features including HDR imaging and an on-screen exposure setting option, a quad-core Snapdragon 410 processor, and the latest version of Android, 6.0.1 "Marshmallow". The phone back is removable, and made of textured plastic. The back also comes in multiple colors available in Motorola's Moto Maker website. The Moto G 3rd-generation is water resistant through the use of nano-coating and internal rubber gaskets, giving it an IPX7 rating. This water resistance gives the phone the ability to be submerged in up to one meter (or about three feet) of water for 30 minutes at a time with the back cover secured correctly. The model comes with 8GB of storage and 1GB of RAM, while the other model comes with 16GB of storage and 2GB of RAM. This phone also features a 2470 mAh Li-ion non-removable battery. Both models support LTE.

At launch, the phone ran a near-stock Android 5.1 Lollipop operating system, although it has since been upgraded to Android 6.0 Marshmallow, preloaded on new devices and upgradable via an OTA update for devices already on the Lollipop 5.1 OS. The Android Marshmallow 6.0 update for the Moto G 3rd-generation was first widely rolled out in North America starting on December 24, 2015. The phone has both a single-SIM and dual-SIM variant, availability of which vary by market.

Variants

*Band 12 is available with the Android M update.

A Moto G Turbo Edition with a faster eight core Snapdragon 615 processor, 2 GB of RAM, IP67 rating, and Quick Charging was revealed for sale in Mexico, Colombia, and India on 13 November 2015.

Reception
The 3rd generation Moto G received a very positive reception upon release. The Moto G's performance from its 1.4 GHz Snapdragon 410 paired with either 1GB or 2GB of RAM was significantly faster than the 1.2 GHz Snapdragon 410 with 1GB of RAM in the Moto E, and almost as quick as devices powered by the more powerful 1.5 GHz Snapdragon 615 such as the Huawei P8 Lite, which has been attributed to the Moto G's largely bloat-free build of Android 5.1 "Lollipop". While the 2nd generation Moto G was regarded as a "sidegrade" rather than a true successor to the 1st generation (since it retains largely the same specifications), the Moto G 3rd generation was considered a big improvement over its predecessors. The rear camera's photo quality (except in low-light conditions) was much lauded considering the Moto G's budget price (sharing the same sensor as the much more expensive Nexus 6) and its predecessors' poor camera performance. The IPX7 water resistance (unique among smartphones in its price range at the time) was also praised by reviewers. Ars Technica proclaimed "the fact that the Moto G is so competent drives home the superfluousness of so many flagship phone features—the move from 720p to 1080p to 1440p and beyond, faster SoCs, ever-thinner metal-and-glass slabs. Those things are all nice to have, but you’d be hard-pressed to argue that any of them are essential," referring to the surprising value of the 3rd-generation Moto G considering its price.

There have been criticisms of the 3rd generation Moto G. For example, the IPS panel screen's calibration was poorer than its 2014 predecessor. Despite brighter, more vibrant colours and wider viewing angles, the display still suffered from "muted" greens and "washed-out" outdoor performance. Low light camera performance was also criticized (with similar criticism also being leveled at the Nexus 6, which shares the same camera sensor). The 8 GB of storage and 1 GB of RAM configuration leaves little more than 4 GB out-of-the-box for user-accessible storage, although this was partially addressed with the inclusion of a Micro SD card slot expandable officially up to 32 GB and unofficially up to 128 GB. The lack of RAM on the 8 GB model has also been said to significantly reduce multitasking performance. The criticisms aimed at the low-end model would not be so much of an issue for the 3rd-generation Moto G if the other model had been available in all markets, as some countries only have the 8 GB model available.

Known issues
Multiple users reported having a problem with the microSD card reader, which would stop recognizing the SD card, leading to possible loss of data and inability to use the SD card. The problem appears to remain unaddressed.

The Moto G3, like many older phones, is vulnerable to the series of vulnerabilities known as BlueBorne. Retail versions of this phone are no longer receiving security updates according to the Lenovo Support Site, so it will apparently remain unpatched (carrier support may vary). Unofficial versions via custom ROMs such as LineageOS were likely to solve two of those following issues.

See also
Comparison of smartphones

References

Further reading

External links
Moto G gen-3 at GSM Arena
Moto G (3rd gen.) – Motorola Support

Android (operating system) devices
Mobile phones introduced in 2015
Motorola smartphones